Holly Dagres (Los Angeles, California) is an Iranian-American analyst and commentator on the Middle East with a focus on Iran. She is a nonresident senior fellow at the Washington-based think tank, the Atlantic Council. She is also editor of the IranSource blog and the curator for the weekly newsletter, The Iranist.

Early life and education
Dagres was born in Los Angeles to an Iranian immigrant mother and American father. In 1999, she moved to Tehran, Iran. Dagres spent her teenage years in Iran, from 1999 to 2006, during which time she graduated from Tehran International School. Dagres received her bachelor's degree from the University of California, Los Angeles and her master's degree from the American University in Cairo.

Career
Dagres is a contributing editor at the Cairo Review of Global Affairs. Dagres regularly conducts interviews for television, radio, and print, including BBC News, CNN, Fox News, NBC News, the New York Times, the Telegraph, and Washington Post, among others. Her work has appeared in numerous publications including Al Jazeera, Al-Monitor, Atlantic Council, Buzzfeed, Foreign Policy, the Huffington Post, and Voice of America.

In 2009, Dagres entered the Miss California USA 2010 beauty pageant as Miss Northridge.

In 2015, Your Middle East called Dagres one of the must follow Instagram users of the Middle East. Her Instagram account was called one of the "8 stunning Instagram accounts that shed light on the real Iran" by Elan Magazine. It was also featured by Al Jazeera English's "Stream of the Week" as a glimpse into Iran.

In 2017, Dagres posted a photo of her late Iranian grandmother with hashtag #GrandparentsNotTerrorists to show solidarity against U.S. President Donald Trump's Executive Order 13769, also known as the Muslim Ban. After it went viral, she and a friend started the 'Banned Grandmas' Instagram account to remind Americans that the ban is ongoing and continues to affect American families.

In 2018, Dagres joined the Washington-based think tank, the Atlantic Council as a nonresident senior fellow and editor of the IranSource blog.

References

External links
Holly Dagres' Twitter Account
Holly Dagres' Official Website

American people of Iranian descent
People from Los Angeles
American expatriates in Egypt
University of California, Los Angeles alumni
The American University in Cairo alumni
1986 births
Living people